Zippe may refer to:

People
 Augustin Zippe (1747, Česká Kamenice ? - 1816), Bohemian-Austrian educator
 Franz Xaver (Maxmillian) Zippe (1791, Dolní Falknov, Kytlice - 1863), Bohemian mineralogist
 Zippeite
 Anton Konrad Zippe (1889, Krompach - 1964), Bohemian-Austrian educator and politician
 Gernot Zippe (1917, Varnsdorf - 2008), Bohemian-Austrian engineer
 Zippe-type centrifuge
 Stanislav Zippe (born 1943, Hořice), a Czech artist, painter, sculptor

Other
 Zippe, a term used in the card game of Skat

See also 
 Zipp (disambiguation)

References 

German-language surnames
Surnames of Czech origin